United Nations Security Council resolution 516, adopted on 1 August 1982, after recalling resolutions 508 (1982), 509 (1982), 512 (1982), 513 (1982) and 515 (1982), the council demanded an immediate cessation of military activities between Israel and Lebanon, noting the violations of the ceasefire in Beirut.

The resolution then authorised the secretary-general to deploy United Nations observers immediately in and around the Lebanese capital Beirut, and to report back on the situation no later than four hours from the adoption of this resolution.

See also
 1982 Lebanon War
 Blue Line
 Green Line, Beirut
 Israeli–Lebanese conflict
 List of United Nations Security Council Resolutions 501 to 600 (1982–1987)
 Siege of Beirut

References
Text of the Resolution at undocs.org

External links
 

 0516
Israeli–Lebanese conflict
 0516
1982 in Israel
1982 in Lebanon
 0516
August 1982 events